Grevillea leptobotrys, commonly known as tangled grevillea, is a species of flowering plant in the family Proteaceae and is endemic to the south-west of Western Australia. It is a prostrate shrub with simple and toothed, or divided leaves, the lobes further divided, the end lobes triangular, egg-shaped, oblong or more or less linear, and clusters of pale to deep lilac-pink flowers.

Description
Flowering mainly occurs from October to December, but flowers are present in most months.

Taxonomy
Grevillea leptobotrys was first formally described in 1848 by Carl Meissner in Johann Georg Christian Lehmann's Plantae Preissianae from specimens collected by James Drummond in the Swan River Colony. The specific epithet (leptobotrys) means "a slender bunch of grapes".

Distribution and habitat
Tangled grevillea grows in woodland and shrubby forest in the area between Cranbrook, Brookton, North Bannister and Shannon in the Avon Wheatbelt, Jarrah Forest and Swan Coastal Plain bioregions of south-western Western Australia.

Conservation status
This grevillea is listed as "not threatened" by the Western Australian Government Department of Biodiversity, Conservation and Attractions.

See also
 List of Grevillea species

References

leptobotrys
Endemic flora of Western Australia
Eudicots of Western Australia
Proteales of Australia
Taxa named by Carl Meissner
Plants described in 1848